Luthier (1965–1981) was a French Thoroughbred racehorse who was the Leading sire in France on four occasions. Bred at Baron Guy de Rothschild's Haras de Meautry, he was trained by Geoffroy Watson. Racing for Baron Rothschild at age three, Luthier won important races in France but is best remembered as a Champion sire and broodmare sire.

Stud record
Retired to stud in 1970 at Haras de Étréham in Lower Normandy, he was the French Champion First Crop Sire of 1973 and the Leading sire in France in 1976, 1982, 1983, and 1984. A sire of sixty-one stakes winners, among his notable progeny, Luthier sired Sagace, winner of the 1984 Prix de l'Arc de Triomphe and the filly Riverqueen whose wins at age three in 1976 included the Grand Prix de Saint-Cloud, Poule d'Essai des Pouliches, and Prix Saint-Alary. Luthier was also the sire of Saint Cyrien, the 1982 Champion 2-year-old colt in France and Leading sire in France in 1990, plus the 1974 and 1983 Oaks d'Italia winner and the 1980 Premio Regina Elena (Italian 1,000 Guineas) winner.

Luthier was the Leading sire in France eight times with ninety-six stakes winners including 1989 St. Leger Stakes winner, Michelozzo.

References
 Luthier's pedigree and partial racing stats
 Luthier at Thoroughbred Times Stallion Directory

1965 racehorse births
1981 racehorse deaths
Racehorses bred in Calvados (department)
Racehorses trained in France
Champion Thoroughbred Sires of France
Thoroughbred family 14-c
Byerley Turk sire line
Chefs-de-Race